Veluthur  is a village in Thrissur district in the state of Kerala, India. It is surrounded by paddy fields. Veluthur is famous for Namborkkavu temple vedikettu(fire and cracker works in pooram festivals)

Demographics
 India census, Veluthur had a population of 7894 with 3911 males and 3983 females.

References

Villages in Thrissur district